Zapata County is a county located in the U.S. state of Texas. As of the 2020 census, its population was 13,889. Its county seat is Zapata. The county is named for Colonel José Antonio de Zapata, a rancher in the area who rebelled against Mexico.

Zapata County comprises the Zapata, TX Micropolitan Statistical Area.

The South Texas Oil Boom included wells drilled in Zapata County in the early 1920s through the work of Laredo industrialist Oliver Winfield Killam, a Missouri native who once served as an Oklahoma state legislator. It is east from the Mexico–United States border.

Geography
It is located in the Rio Grande Valley, on the shore of Falcon International Reservoir. It was previously linked to Mexico by an international bridge, but this was flooded when the Falcon Dam and reservoir was built. It is now linked to Mexico by the Falcon Dam Port of Entry.

Major highways
  U.S. Highway 83
  State Highway 16

Adjacent counties and municipalities
 Webb County (north)
 Jim Hogg County (east)
 Starr County (southeast)
 Guerrero, Tamaulipas, Mexico (west)

National protected area
 Lower Rio Grande Valley National Wildlife Refuge (part)

Demographics

As of the 2020 United States census, there were 13,889 people, 4,689 households, and 3,254 families residing in the county.

As of the census of 2000, there were 12,182 people, 3,921 households, and 3,164 families residing in the county. Zapata County is estimated to be the eleventh fastest growing county (+15.8%) in the state of Texas since the year 2000 (based on % of population change). The population density was 12 people per square mile (5/km2).  There were 6,167 housing units at an average density of 6 per square mile (2/km2).  The racial makeup of the county was 84.07% White, 0.41% Black or African American, 0.32% Native American, 0.19% Asian, 0.04% Pacific Islander, 12.64% from other races, and 2.33% from two or more races.  84.78% of the population were Hispanic or Latino of any race.

There were 3,921 households, out of which 43.20% had children under the age of 18 living with them, 64.20% were married couples living together, 13.00% had a female householder with no husband present, and 19.30% were non-families. 17.50% of all households were made up of individuals, and 10.30% had someone living alone who was 65 years of age or older.  The average household size was 3.10 and the average family size was 3.52.

In the county, the population was spread out, with 33.00% under the age of 18, 10.00% from 18 to 24, 24.10% from 25 to 44, 18.60% from 45 to 64, and 14.30% who were 65 years of age or older.  The median age was 31 years. For every 100 females there were 96.80 males.  For every 100 females age 18 and over, there were 93.70 males.

The median income for a household in the county was $24,635, and the median income for a family was $26,722. Males had a median income of $26,294 versus $14,579 for females. The per capita income for the county was $10,486.  About 29.30% of families and 35.80% of the population were below the poverty line, including 46.10% of those under age 18 and 21.30% of those age 65 or over.

Government and politics
Zapata County, in most elections, has always overwhelmingly supported the Democratic Party. However, on three occasions, it gave record-setting margins to Republican presidential nominees, when it delivered the highest percentage of the vote of any county in the nation to them. First in 1896, when it gave 96.3% of the vote to William McKinley, though he lost Texas as a whole (with 30.8% of the statewide popular vote), but won the national election (with 51.0% of the nationwide popular vote). The second time in 1908, when William Howard Taft won 99.1% of the vote in the county, despite losing the state to Democrat William Jennings Bryan (and receiving just 22.4% of the statewide vote), but winning the national election (with 51.6% of the nationwide popular vote). The third and final time was in 1912, when it again gave then-incumbent President Taft 80.9%, but against the state and nation's preference for the Democratic victor, Woodrow Wilson (in the popular vote, Taft only received 9.5% statewide and 23.2% nationwide). It voted Republican for President (Warren G. Harding) in 1920, and then consistently voted Democratic until 2020, when Republican Donald Trump defeated Democrat Joe Biden 52%-47%, about the same as the statewide margin, making it the most Hispanic county or equivalent to vote for Trump.

Education
All of Zapata County is a part of the Zapata County Independent School District. Residents are zoned to Laredo Community College.

Communities
There are no incorporated areas in Zapata County and hence no municipal governments.

Census-designated places

 Falcon Lake Estates
 Falcon Mesa
 Las Palmas
 Lopeño
 Los Lobos
 Medina
 Morales-Sanchez
 New Falcon
 Ramireno
 San Ygnacio
 Siesta Shores
 Zapata (county seat)

Gallery

See also

 National Register of Historic Places listings in Zapata County, Texas
 Recorded Texas Historic Landmarks in Zapata County

References

External links
 
 Current Hang Gliding Records

 
1858 establishments in Texas
Populated places established in 1858
Majority-minority counties in Texas
Hispanic and Latino American culture in Texas